Pilibacter is a genus of bacteria of the Enterococcaceae. This genus contains a single species, Pilibacter termitis, strains of which were isolated from a termite (Coptotermes formosanus Shiraki).

Bacteria in this genus have been found in the respiratory tracts of human patients with pulmonary tuberculosis.

References

External links
 LPSN entry for Pilibacter

Bacteria genera
Enterococcaceae
Gram-positive bacteria
Monotypic bacteria genera